is a Japanese politician of the Liberal Democratic Party, a member of the House of Representatives in the Diet (national legislature). A native of Tokyo and graduate of Keio University, he received his master's degrees from Keio University and Harvard University and completed a program at the American Film Institute. He was elected to the House of Representatives for the first time in 2001.

In 1988, Ito directed development for a political video game, America Daitōryō Senkyo.

References

External links
 Official website in Japanese.

1953 births
Living people
People from Tokyo
Keio University alumni
Harvard University alumni
Members of the House of Representatives (Japan)
Liberal Democratic Party (Japan) politicians
21st-century Japanese politicians